Roger Maxwell Ramey (9 September 1905 – 4 March 1963) was an American officer who reached the rank of Lieutenant General in the United States Air Force. He retired in January 1957 over heart problems and died six years later.

Early life and career
Ramey was born in Sulphur Springs, Texas. He attended North Texas Teachers College and aspired to practice medicine, but was persuaded to compete in the examination for a place in West Point by his captain in the National Guard. He was enrolled at West Point in 1924 and graduated as a second lieutenant in 1928.

After his graduation, Ramey enrolled in the Air Corps Primary Flying School and graduated from the Air Corps Advanced Flying School in September 1929.

Between the wars
He served with the 27th Pursuit Squadron in Michigan for a time and in 1932 was made commanding officer of the 38th Pursuit Squadron. Later he served as a flight instructor in Randolph Field, Texas.

World War II
In January 1942 during United States' involvement in World War II, Ramey became plans and training officer of the VII Bomber Command. The next month he was promoted to Colonel. In October 1942 he transferred to the Fifth Air Force, in which he served as commanding officer of 43rd Bomb Group and 314th Bomb Wing.

Postwar service 
At Operation Crossroads, Nuclear testing at Bikini Atoll in 1946, Ramey was the director of the "Able" shot and commander of Task Force 1.5.

Ramey assumed command of the Eighth Air Force as a temporary Brigadier General in January 1947. He was also the commander of Carswell Air Force Base, then known as Fort Worth Army Airfield. He was responsible for reversing the stance on the nature of the crashed craft of the Roswell UFO incident later in 1947. He was famously photographed with a telex in his hand on 8 July 1947 that Ufologists believe may confirm a cover-up. The photograph has been subject to much analyzing with little conclusive results.

In May 1954 Ramey assumed command of the Fifth Air Force in Korea, and was promoted to temporary Lieutenant General in June 1954.

Retirement 
Ramey retired on 31 January 1957 over heart problems. He died on 4 March 1963 in Torrance, California.

Summary of service

Dates of rank
Sources:

References 

Military personnel from Texas
People from Sulphur Springs, Texas
Recipients of the Legion of Merit
Recipients of the Distinguished Flying Cross (United States)
Recipients of the Distinguished Service Medal (US Army)
Recipients of the Distinguished Service Cross (United States)
Roswell incident
United States Air Force generals
United States Army Air Forces personnel of World War II
1905 births
1963 deaths